Brayan Adan Martinez (born 22 January 1990) is a Mexican football player who currently plays for the Monterrey Flash as a striker or winger.

Career
He plays for Puebla in the Primera División de México. He joined Monterrey youth squad in 2006 where, after playing in the under 20 youth reserve, he was called up to play his first professional game in the 2009–10 Copa Libertadores, although never having played in any league games. In 2010, he was called up, this time to take part of the 2010–2011 CONCACAF Champions League. In 2011, he was loaned to Puebla FC where he finally made his Primera División debut on 9 January, against Chivas.

References

External links

1990 births
Living people
Footballers from Puebla
Club Puebla players
Venados F.C. players
Club Atlético Zacatepec players
Xelajú MC players
Mexican expatriate footballers
Expatriate footballers in Guatemala
Mexican expatriate sportspeople in Guatemala
Association football forwards
Association football midfielders
Major Arena Soccer League players
Monterrey Flash players
Mexican footballers